The Suncorp Super Netball Young Star Award, also referred to as the Rookie of the Year or Rising Star, is an annual Suncorp Super Netball award in Australia.

It is an award recognising the outstanding on-court achievements of a Suncorp Super Netball athlete. Previously to 2022, to be eligible for the award the netballer had to be aged under 23 years at the beginning of the season. However, the award was modified to remove the age criterion and instead acknowledge any player who has played at least five games in their first year in the league.

Winners

References

Young